Richard Andrés Rodríguez Álvez (born 13 July 1992) is a footballer who plays as a midfielder for Liga Primera club Real Estelí FC. Born in Uruguay, he represents the Nicaragua national team.

Career
Born and raised in Uruguay, he moved to Nicaragua for the first time in early 2018, when he joined Real Estelí FC. After just a season and a half playing for them and shortly after signing for Paraguayan club Deportivo Santaní, he was naturalized by Nicaragua and made his international debut on 5 September 2019.

References

1992 births
Living people
People from Canelones Department
Nicaraguan men's footballers
Nicaragua international footballers
Uruguayan men's footballers
Uruguayan emigrants to Nicaragua
Naturalized citizens of Nicaragua
Association football midfielders
C.A. Rentistas players
Canadian Soccer Club players
Platense F.C. players
Sportivo Cerrito players
C.D.S. Vida players
Deportivo Santaní players
Uruguayan Segunda División players
Uruguayan Primera División players
Liga Nacional de Fútbol Profesional de Honduras players
Paraguayan Primera División players
Uruguayan expatriate footballers
Uruguayan expatriate sportspeople in Honduras
Expatriate footballers in Honduras
Uruguayan expatriate sportspeople in Paraguay
Expatriate footballers in Paraguay
Real Estelí F.C. players
Nicaraguan Primera División players